Zlatko Šimenc (born 29 November 1938) is a retired Croatian water polo player and coach (1969-1975) of Slovenian origin. He was part of the Yugoslav teams that won a silver medal at the 1964 Olympics and placed fourth in 1960. He won three more medals at the European championships in 1958–1966.

Šimenc's parents moved from Slovenia to Croatia before he was born. They had three sons and one daughter, with Zlatko being the youngest child. He took up swimming aged 11, and in his twenties changed to water polo and handball. He trained as a water polo defender in the summer and as a handball striker in the winter, and won national titles in both sports with his club Mladost. Between 1955 and 1975 he played 101 water polo and 24 handball matches for the national Yugoslav teams.

In 1958, Šimenc enrolled to study law, but next year changed to the newly established in Zagreb institute of physical education, and graduated in 1966. He later earned a master's degree in social sciences and defended a PhD in kinesiology. Since 1966 until retirement he worked at the Department of Team Sports of the University of Zagreb, and published ca. 60 scientific papers and books on handball and water polo. In parallel he served as a sports official at the Yugoslav (1980–82) and Croatian (1992–96) water polo federations and was a member of the Croatian Olympic Committee (1991–95). His son Dubravko also became an Olympic medalist in water polo, while his daughter Iva is a coach and former competitor in synchronized swimming.

See also
 List of Olympic medalists in water polo (men)

References

External links

 
 Zlatko Šimenc at Encyclopedia LZMK

1938 births
Living people
Croatian male water polo players
Croatian water polo coaches
Yugoslav male water polo players
Olympic water polo players of Yugoslavia
Water polo players at the 1960 Summer Olympics
Water polo players at the 1964 Summer Olympics
Olympic silver medalists for Yugoslavia
Olympic medalists in water polo
Sportspeople from Zagreb
Medalists at the 1964 Summer Olympics
Mediterranean Games gold medalists for Yugoslavia
Mediterranean Games silver medalists for Yugoslavia
Competitors at the 1959 Mediterranean Games
Competitors at the 1963 Mediterranean Games
Mediterranean Games medalists in water polo
University of Zagreb alumni
Croatian people of Slovenian descent
Croatian sports executives and administrators